K28 may refer to:
 K-28 (Kansas highway)
 K-28 trailer, part of the SCR-268 radar system
 Rio Grande class K-28, an American steam locomotive
 Sonata in C, K. 28, by Wolfgang Amadeus Mozart